This is a list of foreign women's footballers, who have played or still play in the Turkish Women's Super League (2021– ) or the Women's First League (2008–2021, 2022– ).

Article 18 of the Turkish Football Federation (TFF)'s status for the women's football leagues covers the regulations for the expatriate women's footballers, which can be registered by clubs of the Women's First League. The maximum number of expatriate players of a club in one league season was set as five.  With the Article 20 of the TFF status for the 2021–22 Women's Super League season, the maximum number of expatriate women's footballers was increased from five to six. Domestic transfer of registered expatriate players from one club to another may take place only during the transfer window, and if the receiving club's quota allows it. License, visa and transfer procedures of expatriate football players are valid only within the player's residence permit period. Up to six expatriate players may appear in the squad namelist, and may play in the same competition. The maximum number of six expatriate players will apply also in the 2022–23 season, will decrease to maximum five from the 2023–24 season on including. The TFF issues a certificate of conformity for the purpose of expatriate player's residence permit application to the Immigration Administration. License for the expatriate player is issued by the TFF in relation with the club following the arrival of the International Transfer Certificate (IFC). Naturalized expatriate footballers can play as Turkish footballers only after three years from the date of related first application. Contract of expatriate players terminate when their team relegates to the Women's Second League, at which no expatriate players are allowed. In this case, those players can be transferred by another Women's Super League club in the next season. A license fee for the expatriate player has to be deposited by the club at the TFF.

As of the 2022–23 Women's Super League and First League season:

Notes

References

 
 
Women's football in Turkey
Women's
Lists of women's association football players
Lists of expatriate association football players
Association football player non-biographical articles